And Then You Die may refer to:
 And Then You Die (novel), a 2002 novel by Michael Dibdin
 And Then You Die (TV series), a British comedy panel show